The 7th season of the television series Arthur was originally broadcast on PBS in the United States from October 8 to November 29, 2002 and contains 10 episodes. The special "Arthur, It's Only Rock 'N' Roll" served as the premiere of this season. Jason Szwimer replaced Oliver Grainger as the voice of D.W. Alex Hood is cast as the new voice of Alan "The Brain" Powers, replacing Steven Crowder.  Mark Rendall replaced Justin Bradley as Arthur (who would later dub on re-runs of season 6, due to Justin Bradley's dialogue being unfavorable). This is the last season in which Patricia Rodriguez voices Catherine Frensky, Also this is the last season Vanessa Lengies voiced Emily, And Also This Is The final season Where Jonathan Koensgen voices Tommy Tibble, and this is the first season in which Mitchell Rothpan voices George Lundgren. The series won a Daytime Emmy in 2003 for 
Outstanding Sound Mixing - Live Action and Animation.

Episodes

References 

General references 
 
 
 
 

2002 American television seasons
Arthur (TV series) seasons
2002 Canadian television seasons